State and Main is a 2000 comedy film written and directed by David Mamet and starring William H. Macy, Sarah Jessica Parker, Alec Baldwin, Julia Stiles, Philip Seymour Hoffman, Rebecca Pidgeon, David Paymer, Patti LuPone, Clark Gregg, and Charles Durning.

Plot 
Havoc is wrought on the inhabitants of a small New England town by a troubled film production. After the leading man's penchant for underage girls gets them banished from their New Hampshire location, the crew moves to the small town of Waterford, Vermont to finish shooting The Old Mill.

As its title suggests, the film depends on the presence of a genuine mill, something the town is reported to possess. Unfortunately, with only days before principal photography begins, it becomes apparent that the mill in fact burned down decades ago.

Unfazed, the film's director, Walt Price (William H. Macy), places his faith in the ability of first-time screenwriter Joseph Turner White (Philip Seymour Hoffman) to alter the script. What he doesn't count on is White's apparently bottomless reserve of angst-fueled writer's block. A local bookseller, Annie Black (Rebecca Pidgeon), tries to provide White with inspiration.

The film's leading lady (Sarah Jessica Parker) refuses to do her contracted nude scene unless she's paid an additional $800,000, while the foreign cinematographer offends the locals by messing with a historic firehouse. Meanwhile, the leading man, Bob Barrenger (Alec Baldwin), dallies with Carla (Julia Stiles), a crafty local teen.

Everything comes to a head after Barrenger and Carla are injured in a car accident, which leads White (the only witness) to another emotional quandary and into the arms of Annie.  Meanwhile, a powerful movie producer (David Paymer) comes to town to help Price with the ensuing mess.

Cast 
William H. Macy – Walt Price
Sarah Jessica Parker – Claire Wellesley
Alec Baldwin – Bob Barrenger
Julia Stiles – Carla
Philip Seymour Hoffman – Joseph Turner White
Rebecca Pidgeon – Ann
David Paymer – Marty Rossen
Clark Gregg – Doug Mackenzie
Patti LuPone – Sherry Bailey
Charles Durning – Mayor George Bailey
Lionel Mark Smith – Bill Smith
Ricky Jay – Jack
Michael Higgins – Doc Wilson
Jonathan Katz – Howie Gold
Laura Silverman – Secretary
Michael Bradshaw – Town Priest
J. J. Johnston – Stationmaster
John Krasinski – Caddy / Judge's assistant(uncredited)

Production
The plot involves the on-location production in Waterford, Vermont, of a film called The Old Mill. The actual film was shot in Massachusetts in Manchester-by-the-Sea, Beverly, Dedham and Waltham.

Reception

Awards
Casting Society of America 
Won: Artios – Best Casting for Feature Film – Comedy (Avy Kaufman)
Chicago Film Critics Association 
Nominated: Best Screenplay (David Mamet)
Florida Film Critics Circle 
Won: Best Ensemble Cast
Won: Best Screenplay (David Mamet)
Ft. Lauderdale International Film Festival 
Won: Jury Award – Best Film (David Mamet) 
Won: Best Supporting Male (William H. Macy)
National Board of Review
Won: Best Acting by an Ensemble
Online Film Critics Society 
Won: Best Ensemble Cast Performance (tied with Almost Famous)
Nominated: Best Screenplay (David Mamet) 
Satellite Awards
Nominated: Best Motion Picture – Comedy or Musical
Nominated: Best Performance by an Actress in a Supporting Role – Comedy or Musical (Rebecca Pidgeon) 
Nominated: Best Screenplay – Original (David Mamet)

Notes

External links

 
 
 

2000 films
2000 comedy films
Films directed by David Mamet
Waterford, Vermont
2000s English-language films
Vermont culture
Films shot in Dedham, Massachusetts
Films set in Vermont
Films about filmmaking
American comedy films
American satirical films
Films scored by Theodore Shapiro
Films about film directors and producers
Films about Hollywood, Los Angeles
Films about screenwriters
Films about actors
2000s American films